Ōhau is a village and semi-rural community in the Horowhenua District and Manawatū-Whanganui region of New Zealand's North Island. It is located just south of Levin on State Highway 1.

The former Ohau railway station is located in Ohau. It operated from 1886 to 1987, with most services ending in 1971.

Marae

The local Kikopiri Marae and Kikopiri meeting house are a tribal meeting ground for the Ngāti Raukawa hapū of Ngāti Hikitanga and Ngāti Kikopiri.

In October 2020, the Government committed $335,056 from the Provincial Growth Fund to upgrade Kikopiri Marae and Kererū Marae, creating 48 jobs.

Demographics

The population of Ōhau was 669 in the 2018 New Zealand census, an increase of 111 (19.9%) since the 2013 census, and an increase of 234 (53.8%) since the 2006 census. There were 354 males and 315 females, giving a sex ratio of 1.12 males per female. Ethnicities were 630 people  (94.2%) European/Pākehā, 72 (10.8%) Māori, 9 (1.3%) Pacific peoples, and 15 (2.2%) Asian (totals add to more than 100% since people could identify with multiple ethnicities). Of the total population, 96 people  (14.3%) were under 15 years old, 96 (14.3%) were 15–29, 312 (46.6%) were 30–64, and 168 (25.1%) were over 65.

Ōhau-Manakau

Ōhau-Manakau had a population of 2,154 at the 2018 New Zealand census, an increase of 369 people (20.7%) since the 2013 census, and an increase of 363 people (20.3%) since the 2006 census. There were 825 households. There were 1,086 males and 1,065 females, giving a sex ratio of 1.02 males per female. The median age was 51.4 years (compared with 37.4 years nationally), with 318 people (14.8%) aged under 15 years, 291 (13.5%) aged 15 to 29, 969 (45.0%) aged 30 to 64, and 573 (26.6%) aged 65 or older.

Ethnicities were 84.7% European/Pākehā, 17.3% Māori, 3.1% Pacific peoples, 5.2% Asian, and 1.0% other ethnicities (totals add to more than 100% since people could identify with multiple ethnicities).

The proportion of people born overseas was 17.1%, compared with 27.1% nationally.

Although some people objected to giving their religion, 52.8% had no religion, 35.1% were Christian, 0.6% were Hindu, 0.1% were Muslim, 0.4% were Buddhist and 1.9% had other religions.

Of those at least 15 years old, 249 (13.6%) people had a bachelor or higher degree, and 441 (24.0%) people had no formal qualifications. The median income was $27,600, compared with $31,800 nationally. The employment status of those at least 15 was that 849 (46.2%) people were employed full-time, 255 (13.9%) were part-time, and 60 (3.3%) were unemployed.

Education

References

Populated places in Manawatū-Whanganui
Horowhenua District